Georg Kippels (born 21 September 1959) is a German lawyer and politician of the Christian Democratic Union (CDU) who has been serving as a member of the Bundestag from the state of North Rhine-Westphalia since 2013.

Political career 
Kippels first became a member of the Bundestag in the 2013  German federal election. He has since been serving on the Health Committee on Health and the Committee on Economic Cooperation and Development. In 2018, he also joined the newly established Sub-Committee on Global Health.

In addition to his committee assignments, Kippels serves as deputy chairman of the German-Mexican Parliamentary Friendship Group.

Other activities 
 German Network against Neglected Tropical Diseases (DNTDs), Member of the Parliamentary Advisory Board (since 2018)
 German Health Partnership (GHP), Member of the Advisory Board (since 2017)
 "End Polio Now", Chairman of the Parliamentary Advisory Board (2018–2022)
 German Foundation for World Population (DSW), Member of the Parliamentary Advisory Board
 German Red Cross (DRK), Member
 Lions Clubs International, Member

Political positions
In June 2017, Kippels voted against Germany's introduction of same-sex marriage.

References

External links 

  
 Bundestag biography 

1959 births
Living people
Members of the Bundestag for North Rhine-Westphalia
Members of the Bundestag 2021–2025
Members of the Bundestag 2017–2021
Members of the Bundestag 2013–2017
Members of the Bundestag for the Christian Democratic Union of Germany